"Step and Go" is a song recorded by Japanese boy band Arashi. It was released as a CD single in three editions: a regular edition containing instrumental versions of all the songs, a limited edition containing a DVD, and a special "Cubic Box" edition, which was only available to members of the group's official fan club in Japan. The latter edition contains an organizer set and a special edition CD. Unlike the group's previous release "Secret Talk", which contained only audio tracks, the limited edition of the single contains a filmed version of the talk.

Chart performance
The single debuted at number one on the Oricon and Billboard Japan charts and sold over 300,000 copies in its first week. When the Billboard Japan charts debuted on February 29, 2008, "Step and Go" was its first Hot 100 and Hot Singles Sales number one song.

Despite the single's lack of direct tie-ins, the Oricon charts named "Step and Go" the twelfth best-selling single of 2008 in Japan.

Track listing

Charts and certifications

Weekly charts

Year-end charts

Certifications

Release history

References

External links
 Product information

Arashi songs
2008 singles
Oricon Weekly number-one singles
Billboard Japan Hot 100 number-one singles
J Storm singles
2008 songs
Songs written by Sho Sakurai